Arthur! And the Square Knights of the Round Table is a 1966-1968 Australian animated series based on the legend of King Arthur of Camelot.

The series was produced by Air Programs International and written by Melbourne playwright Alex Buzo and British-born entertainer Rod Hull, with Lyle Martin, Michael Robinson, and John Palmer. The characters included King Arthur, Guinevere, Lancelot, Merlin, the Jester, the Black Knight, and Morgana le Fay. The actors who voiced the character parts in the series included: John Meillon (as "Arthur"), Lola Brooks (as "Guinevere" and "Morgana le Fay"), John Ewart, Kevin Golsby, and Matthew O'Sullivan.

By 1969, the series had been sold for broadcast in the United Kingdom and the United States. In Australia, where it was made and produced, it was sold also to the Australian Broadcasting Commission, for broadcast on the ABC-TV network. Typically it was broadcast on Saturday mornings and initially also, on Monday evenings. As the Australian television industry did not go to colour broadcast until March 1975, viewers saw the series in black and white for the first six years of its Australian transmission. 

ABC-TV continued repeated the series for most of the 1970s; its last appearance as children's programming was March 1985. 

The series was broadcast in Italy in the early 1970s. French television purchased it for broadcast in 1980-81, supplying a French soundtrack, without the original music. It was broadcast on the French television channel, TF1. In 1993, the series was also being broadcast on German cable television.

Original episodes
Episode 1
Octopus
Would You Believe, A Beanstalk?
Which Wizard Versus What Witch
Episode 2
There's An Elephant at the Drawbridge
A Nice Knight for a Wedding
Paris Picnic
Episode 3
It's the Only Kingdom I've Got
Old Moody
I'll See If I'm There
Episode 4
The Inn
Seventeen Going on Seventy
Will the Real Arthur Please Stand Up
Episode 5
The Genie Who Came to Dinner
No Laugh Olaf
Some Maidens Just Aren't Fair
Episode 6
New Armour for the King
Smile, Smile, Smile
That's What I Call Music
Episode 7
It's the Gift That Counts
King's Champion
Undercover Knight
Episode 8
How Do You Like Them Apples
Pink is In
Get Your Wish Here
Episode 9
Little Bundle
The Crown Jewels
Mail-Order Bride
Episode 10
The Unicorn of Camelot
Belle of the Ball
While Camelot Sleeps
Episode 11
Play Gypsy Play
Be Kind to Dragons
The Search For Guinevere
Episode 12
Even Knights Have To Eat
The Wrecker
Assault On Castle Morgana

Home releases
Revelation Films released a DVD titled "Arthur and the Square Knights of the Round Table" in 2003. This Region "0" DVD has a 200-minute running time and contains the first 8 episodes, thus containing 24 cartoons of the 36.

Prior to this, Castle Vision had released two VHS video cassettes in 1992. Each of these tapes has 2 episodes, which accordingly have three cartoon stories per episode, making it a total of six stories per 45-minute tape. The Castle Vision tapes were released in the UK, under licence from the rights holders in Australia. Both tapes are in the European PAL format.

References

External links

 
Arthur and the Square Knights of the Round Table at Keyframe - the Animation Resource
Arthur! and the Square Knights of the Round Table' at the National Film and Sound Archive

1966 Australian television series debuts
1968 Australian television series endings
1960s animated television series
Australian Broadcasting Corporation original programming
Television series based on Arthurian legend
Australian children's animated comedy television series
Australian children's animated fantasy television series
Television series by Endemol Australia